Genta Alparedo (born, 7 October 2001) is an Indonesian professional footballer who plays as a midfielder for Liga 2 club Semen Padang and the Indonesia national team.

Club career

Semen Padang
After years of training in the Semen Padang youth system in his hometown of Padang, Alparedo was promoted to the senior team in 2020 but failed to debut because the 2020 Liga 2 season was canceled before it began due to the COVID-19 pandemic.

Arema (loan)
In January 2022, Alparedo signed a contract with Liga 1 club Arema on loan from Persis Solo. He made his league debut in a 2–0 win against PSS Sleman on 13 January 2022 as a substitute for Kushedya Hari Yudo in the 72nd minute at the Kapten I Wayan Dipta Stadium, Gianyar.

International career
Alparedo had never played for any Indonesian youth team or in any professional game when Indonesia national team coach Shin Tae-yong in May 2021 called him to join the senior team. He was also the only lower-league player in the selected list. He earned his first cap when he came in as a substitute in a 25 May friendly match in Dubai against Afghanistan. In October 2021, Genta was called up to the Indonesia U23 in a friendly match against Tajikistan and Nepal and also prepared for 2022 AFC U-23 Asian Cup qualification in Tajikistan by Shin Tae-yong.

Career statistics

Club

International

References

External links
 

Living people
2001 births
People from Padang
Indonesian footballers
Association football midfielders
Indonesia youth international footballers
Semen Padang F.C. players
Liga 2 (Indonesia) players
Sportspeople from West Sumatra